The 2018 Boys' Youth NORCECA Volleyball Championship was the eleventh edition of the bi-annual volleyball tournament. It was held in San Jose, Costa Rica from 4 June to 11 June. Seven countries competed in the tournament. Cuba won the tournament and qualified for the 2019 Boys' U19 World Championship along with the United States. Christian Thondike won the MVP award.

Pool composition

Pool standing procedure
 Number of matches won
 Match points
 Points ratio
 Sets ratio
 Result of the last match between the tied teams

Match won 3–0: 5 match points for the winner, 0 match points for the loser
Match won 3–1: 4 match points for the winner, 1 match point for the loser
Match won 3–2: 3 match points for the winner, 2 match points for the loser

Preliminary round
All times are in Central Standard Time - (UTC−06:00)

Group A

Group B

Final round

Bracket

Quarterfinals

Semifinals

5th place

3rd place

Final

Finals standing

Individual awards

Most Valuable Player

Best Setter

Best Opposite

Best Outside Hitters

Best Middle Blockers

Best Libero

Best Digger

Best Receiver

Best Server

Best Scorer

References

External links
Official website
Competition regulations

2018 Boys' U-19
NORCECA
2018 in Cuban sport